The 2015 NRL Auckland Nines (known as the Dick Smith NRL Auckland Nines due to sponsorship) was the second NRL Auckland Nines tournament, contested between all sixteen teams of the National Rugby League. The draw was released on 16 September 2014. It was a two-day, nine-a-side, knockout tournament held at Eden Park in Auckland, New Zealand. All sixteen NRL clubs and 288 players competed over the one weekend (31 January – 1 February) with AUD$2.4 million prize money split between the teams. In 2015, the pool names were chosen by a public vote. The pool names were: Rangitoto, Waiheke, Piha and Hunua Ranges. The event included two international women's teams, the Kiwi Ferns and the Jillaroos, who competed in a three-game series with the Kiwi Ferns winning 2-1.

Tournament Games

Rangitoto pool

Waiheke pool

Hunua Ranges pool

Piha pool

Finals

Kiwi Ferns v. Jillaroos

Players

Team of the Tournament

Brisbane Broncos

Canberra Raiders

Canterbury-Bankstown Bulldogs

Cronulla-Sutherland Sharks

Gold Coast Titans

Manly-Warringah Sea Eagles

Melbourne Storm

Newcastle Knights

North Queensland Cowboys

Parramatta Eels

Penrith Panthers

South Sydney Rabbitohs

St. George Illawarra Dragons

Sydney Roosters

New Zealand Warriors

Wests Tigers

Jillaroos

Kiwi Ferns

References

External links
 

NRL Auckland Nines
South Sydney Rabbitohs
Auckland Nines